Jalen Mills (born April 6, 1994) is an American football cornerback who is a free agent. He played college football at LSU, where he received first-team All-American honors, and was selected by the Philadelphia Eagles in the seventh round of 2016 NFL Draft. Mills was a member of the Eagles for five seasons, winning a Super Bowl title in Super Bowl LII, before joining the Patriots.

Early years
Mills attended Lancaster High School in Lancaster, before transferring to DeSoto High School in DeSoto, Texas, for his senior year. In 2011, Mills registered 26 tackles, one interception, and six pass breakups, helping the DeSoto Eagles to a 10–2 record and a second-round UIL 5A Division 1 playoff appearance, where they lost 41–31 to Dallas Skyline. Mills was rated by Rivals.com as a three-star recruit and committed to Louisiana State University (LSU) to play college football under head coach Les Miles.

College career
Mills started all 13 games at cornerback his true freshman year at LSU in 2012, recording 57 tackles and two interceptions. As sophomore in 2013, he again started all 13 games, recording 67 tackles, three interceptions, and three sacks. As a junior in 2014, he started 12 games at safety and one at cornerback. He finished the season with 62 tackles and one interception. As a senior in 2015, Mills missed the first six games due to injury. Despite the missed time, he was named a 2015 All-American by CBS Sports.

Professional career
Coming out of LSU, Mills draft projection varied as NFL draft experts and scouts were split. NFL analyst Mel Kiper, CBS Sports, and other draft analysts projected him to be selected as early as the second or third round, while others projected a sixth or seventh round selection. Although he was thought as a top draft pick during his junior year, his stock fell when he suffered a fractured fibula and tore ligaments in his ankle in August 2015. He received an invitation to the NFL combine and completed all of the required combine drills. His 40-yard dash time was mediocre and tied for 33rd among all defensive back prospects. On March 14, 2016, he participated at LSU's pro day and opted to have another attempt at the 40, 20, and 10-yard dash. Mills raised his draft stock after lowering his 40-yard dash time (4.48), but wasn't able to greatly change his combine numbers in the 20 and 10-yard dash. All 32 NFL teams were represented by coaches and scouts to watch Mills, Deion Jones, Vadal Alexander, Lamar Louis, Jerald Hawkins, Quentin Thomas, Reid Ferguson, and five others perform drills at LSU's pro day. He was ranked the eighth best cornerback prospect by Sports Illustrated and the ninth best cornerback by NFLDraftScout.com.

Philadelphia Eagles
The Philadelphia Eagles selected Mills in the seventh round (233rd overall) of the 2016 NFL Draft.

2016
On May 4, 2016, the Philadelphia Eagles signed Mills to a four-year, $2.41 million contract that included a signing bonus of $75,856.

He competed with Eric Rowe, Ron Brooks, Denzel Rice, and Aaron Grymes for a backup cornerback job throughout training camp. Head coach Doug Pederson named Mills the fourth cornerback on the Philadelphia Eagles' depth chart to begin the regular season, behind Nolan Carroll, Leodis McKelvin, and Ron Brooks.

On September 11, 2016, Mills made his professional regular season debut in the Philadelphia Eagles' season-opener against the Cleveland Browns and he recorded two solo tackles in the 29–10 victory. The following week, Mills collected a season-high six solo tackles and defended a pass during a 29–14 win over the Chicago Bears. On October 16, 2016, he earned his first career start and recorded a season-high seven combined tackles and two pass deflections during a 20–27 loss to the Washington Redskins. Overall, he played in all 16 games with two starts as a rookie, recording 61 combined tackles (51 solo) and seven passes defensed.

2017

He competed with Patrick Robinson, Ron Brooks, Ronald Darby, Aaron Grymes, and Rasul Douglas for one of the vacant starting cornerback jobs left by the departures of Nolan Carroll and Leodis McKelvin. Mills was named a starting cornerback along with Ronald Darby and Patrick Robinson to begin the regular season.

On September 10, 2017, Mills recorded nine combined tackles, two pass deflections, and made his first career interception off of a pass attempt by Kirk Cousins during a 30–17 win against the Washington Redskins in the Eagles' season-opener. He made the interception in the end-zone and returned it for 15 yards. In a Week 3 matchup against the New York Giants, Mills recorded a season-high 12 combined tackles and deflected two passes in a 27-24 victory.
On October 12, 2017, in Week 6, Mills collected four combined tackles, deflected a pass, and intercepted a pass attempt from Cam Newton in a 28–23 win over the Carolina Panthers on Thursday Night Football.

On October 29, 2017, in Week 8 against the San Francisco 49ers, Mills recorded three combined tackles, a deflected pass, a tackle for a loss, and intercepted a pass attempt that he returned for a touchdown. For this, he was named NFC Defensive Player of the Week.

On January 21, 2018 in the NFC Championship Mills has 3 tackles, one pass deflection and only gave up two passes for 27 yards in the Eagles’ 38–7 rout of the Minnesota Vikings. Mills appeared in his first career Super Bowl and the Eagles’ third appearance in franchise history, which they would later win against the Patriots, 41-33.

2018
Mills entered the 2018 season as a starting cornerback for the Eagles. He started the first eight games before suffering a foot injury in Week 8. He missed the next four games before being placed on injured reserve on December 8, 2018.

2019
Mills was placed on the reserve/physically unable to perform (PUP) list on August 31, 2019, due to the foot injury suffered last season. He was activated from the PUP list on October 19, 2019.

He made his season debut in week 7 against the Dallas Cowboys.  In the game, Mills recorded an interception off a pass from Dak Prescott in the endzone in the 37–10 loss.

2020
On March 24, 2020, Mills signed a one-year contract with the Eagles. Mills switched to number #21 and would also play safety. In Week 3 against the Cincinnati Bengals, Mills recorded his first 1.5 sacks of the season during the 23–23 tie. In Week 7 against the New York Giants, Mills recorded his first interception of the season off a pass thrown by Daniel Jones during the 22–21 win. Mills was placed on the reserve/COVID-19 list by the Eagles on December 31, 2020, and activated on January 28, 2021.

New England Patriots
On March 19, 2021, Mills signed a four-year, $24 million contract with the New England Patriots.In his first season with the Patriots, Mills was mainly used as the cornerback No.2 behind J.C. Jackson.

NFL career statistics

Personal life
On June 10, 2014, Baton Rouge police arrested Mills on suspicion of second degree battery against a woman that had occurred on May 4, 2014. It was said he had allegedly punched in the mouth a woman he was romantically involved with at his apartment near LSU. His parents bailed him out of East Baton Rouge Parish jail the following day, paying the $10,000 bond. Mills denied the allegations and said it was his girlfriend who assaulted the victim. His girlfriend, who was not identified, then admitted to assaulting the victim.

Mills is nicknamed the "Green Goblin" for his green hairdo.

On April 12, 2019, Mills was arrested and charged with disorderly affray for an altercation with Devin Robinson of the Washington Wizards, outside a DC nightclub. Robinson, who was also charged, was taken to the hospital for injuries.

References

External links
LSU Tigers bio

1994 births
Living people
American football cornerbacks
American football safeties
LSU Tigers football players
New England Patriots players
People from DeSoto, Texas
Philadelphia Eagles players
Players of American football from Texas
Sportspeople from the Dallas–Fort Worth metroplex